Steven Charles Lynex (born 23 January 1958) is an English former professional footballer who made 360 appearances in the Football League playing for Birmingham City, Leicester City, West Bromwich Albion and Cardiff City, and played in the League of Ireland and in the UEFA Cup Winners' Cup for Shamrock Rovers. He played as a winger.

Career
Lynex was born in West Bromwich. He attended Churchfields School and played junior football for Sandwell Rangers before joining West Bromwich Albion in 1974 as an apprentice. In 1976, he was part of the Albion side that won the FA Youth Cup, and in January 1977 manager Johnny Giles gave him his first professional contract. In July of the same year, without having appeared for Albion's first team, Lynex tried his luck in Ireland; after a trial with Sligo Rovers he followed Giles to Shamrock Rovers.

He made his Rovers debut on 28 August 1977 away to Dundalk. During his time at Milltown he played a major role in the 1978 FAI Cup victory, brought down for the penalty which was the only goal of the game. Lynex scored two goals in the UEFA Cup Winners Cup wins over APOEL. He left Rovers in December 1978, and after a trial at Queens Park Rangers he joined Birmingham City in April 1979.

After three years with Birmingham, Lynex moved to Leicester City, where he is remembered for his prolific scoring for a winger as well as for creating chances for Gary Lineker and Alan Smith; he reached double figures of goals scored in three of his five full seasons at the club. He also occasionally appeared as a stand-in goalkeeper, in the days when the Football League only allowed one substitute to be selected, and teams rarely chose a goalkeeper as a substitute.

After a loan spell at one former club Birmingham City, he went on to join another, West Bromwich Albion, and later played for Cardiff City, where he was nicknamed "Lethal Lynex" by the fans. He played his last Football League game in 1990 and then moved into non-league football with Telford United and Trafford Park before turning out in local football with Mitchells and Butlers and Ansells. After retiring as a footballer he went into the licensed trade.

Honours
West Bromwich Albion
 FA Youth Cup winners: 1976
Shamrock Rovers
 FAI Cup winners: 1978
Birmingham City
 Second Division promotion: 1979–80
Leicester City
 Second Division promotion: 1982–83

References

External links
 

1958 births
Living people
Sportspeople from West Bromwich
English footballers
Association football wingers
West Bromwich Albion F.C. players
Shamrock Rovers F.C. players
Birmingham City F.C. players
Leicester City F.C. players
Cardiff City F.C. players
Telford United F.C. players
League of Ireland players
English Football League players
Outfield association footballers who played in goal